This is a list of weapons used by belligerents in the Korean War (1950-1953).

Personal weapons

Sidearms

United Nations command

 Colt M1911A1
 Webley Mk VI
 Enfield No. 2 Mk I**
 Colt Model 1903 Pocket Hammerless
 Colt Commander
 High Standard HDM
 Colt New Service
 M1917 revolver
 Smith & Wesson Model 10
 Colt Detective Special
 Smith & Wesson Model 15
 Smith & Wesson Model 27
 Browning Hi-Power
 Walther PP
 SACM 1935A
 SACM 1935S
 MAC Mle 1950

Communist States

 Luger P08 (PVA)
 Mauser C96 (PVA, KPA)
 Nagant M1895
 Nambu Type 14
 Nambu Type B
 Nambu Type 94
 Nambu Type 26
 Tokarev TT-33
 Walther P38 (PVA)
 Čz vz. 27
 Čz vz. 38
 Čz vz. 45
 Pistol vz. 22
 Pistole vz. 24

Shotguns

United Nations command

 Browning Auto-5 (Limited use)
 Ithaca 37
 Stevens M520-30
 Stevens M620
 Winchester M1897
 Winchester M1912
 Remington Model 10
 Remington Model 11-48 
 Remington Model 31
 Remington Model 870

Carbines

United Nations command

 M1 Carbine
 M1A1 Carbine
 M2 Carbine
 M2A1 Carbine
 M3 Carbine
 Lee-Enfield No.5 Mk.I

Communist States

 Arisaka Type 38 carbine
 Arisaka Type 44 carbine
 M1 carbine (Captured)
 Mosin–Nagant M1944 carbine
 SKS
 vz. 33

Rifles

United Nations command

 Arisaka Type 38 rifle
 Arisaka Type 99 rifle
 Springfield M1903A3
 Springfield M1903A4
 M1 Garand
 M1C Garand
 M1D Garand
 Enfield M1917
 Winchester Model 70
 Lee–Enfield No. 1 Mk III* (Australian only)
 Lee–Enfield No. 4 Mk I
 Lee–Enfield No. 4 Mk I(T)
 FN M1949 (Belgian only)
 MAS-36 (French only)
 MAS-49 (French only)

Communist States

 Arisaka Type 38 rifle
 Arisaka Type 30 rifle
 Arisaka Type 35 rifle 
 Arisaka Type 97 rifle
 Arisaka Type 97 rifle
 Arisaka Type 99 rifle
 TERA Type 2 rifle
 Murata Type 22 rifle
 Chiang Kai-Shek rifle (Licensed copy of the Mauser Standardmodell, also known as Type 24 rifle, PVA)
 Enfield M1917 (PVA)
 Gewehr 41
 Gewehr 43
 Hanyang 88 (PLA)
 M1 Garand (Captured)
 Mauser Gewehr 98
 Mauser Karabiner 98k (PVA)
 Mosin–Nagant M1891/30
 Mosin–Nagant M1891/30 sniper rifle
 PTRD-41
 PTRS-41
 Springfield M1903 (PVA)
 Tokarev SVT-40 (KPA) and (PLA)
 Vz. 24
 Vz. 98/22
 CZ 452

Submachine guns

United Nations command

M3 submachine gun
Thompson M1928A1
M50 Resing
Thompson M1A1
United Defense M42 Marlin (Philippines) 

Madsen M-50 (Used by Thailand troops)
Owen Mark I machine carbine
Sten Mark II
Sten Mark V
Sterling submachine gun
MAT-49 (French only)

Communist States

MP-38
MP-40
MP-41
Nambu Type 100 submachine gun
PPSh-41
PPS-43
Sten submachine gun (PVA)
Thompson M1928A1 (PVA)
Type 36 submachine gun (M3 copy, PVA)
Type 49 submachine gun (PPSh-41 copy)
Type 50 submachine gun (PPSh-41 copy)

Machine guns

United Nations command

Browning M1917A1
Browning M1918A2
Browning M1919A4
Browning M1919A6
Browning M2HB
Bren Mk IV
Vickers machine gun
Lewis machine gun
Besa heavy machine gun
Madsen light machine gun 
MAC FM-24/29 light machine gun
AA-52 heavy machine gun

Communist States

Degtyarev DP-27 light machine gun
Degtyarev DPM light machine gun
Degtyarev RP-46 light machine gun
Goryunov SG-43
DShK 1938
KPV heavy machine gun
Maxim PM1910
MG 34
SIG KE7 (PVA)
Type 24 machine gun (PVA)
Type 1 heavy machine gun 
Nambu Type 3 heavy machine gun 
Type 11 light machine gun
Type 89 heavy machine gun 
Type 92 heavy machine gun
Type 96 light machine gun
Type 97 light machine gun
Type 98 heavy machine gun 
Type 99 light machine gun
ZB vz. 26 (PVA) and (KPA)
ZGB 33
ZB vz. 30
ZB-50
ZB-53
Vz. 37

Rifle grenades and hand grenades

United Nations command

M1A2 grenade adapter
M7A1 rifle grenade launcher for M1 Garand
M8 rifle grenade launcher for M1 Carbine
M9/A1 HEAT (High Explosive Anti-Tank) rifle grenade
M17A1 illumination rifle grenade
M18A1 illumination rifle grenade
M28 anti-tank rifle grenade (A copy of the ENERGA anti-tank rifle grenade)
M62 fragmentation hand grenade
Mark I illumination hand grenade
Mark II fragmentation hand grenade

No.36M Mk.I fragmentation hand grenade (Also known as "Mills bomb")

Communist States

F1 fragmentation hand grenade
M1917 stick grenade
RG-42 fragmentation hand grenade
RGD-33 fragmentation hand grenade
RPG-43 HEAT (High Explosive Anti-Tank) hand grenade
Type 23 grenade (PVA)

Rocket launchers, recoilless rifles and flamethrowers

United Nations command

M2 flamethrower
M9A1 2.36-inch Bazooka rocket launcher
M18 57 mm recoilless rifle
M20 3.5-inch Super Bazooka rocket launcher
M20 75 mm recoilless rifle
M25 3.5-inch repeating rocket launcher (Limited combat testing only)

Projector, Infantry, Anti Tank (Australian troops only, used in the early stages of the war.)

Communist States

Type 36 57mm recoilless rifle (Chinese copy of the US M18 recoilless rifle)
Type 51 90mm rocket launcher (Chinese copy of the US M20 Super Bazooka)

Mortars

United Nations command

M1 81 mm mortar
M2 4.2-inch mortar
M2 60 mm mortar
M19 60 mm mortar
M30 107 mm mortar

Ordnance ML 3-inch mortar
Ordnance ML 4.2-inch mortar
Ordnance SBML 2-inch mortar

Communist States

8 cm Granatwerfer 34
82-BM-41 mortar
120-PM-43 mortar
Type 31 mortar (PVA)

Artillery

United Nations command

M1 240 mm howitzer
M2 90 mm cannon
M16 110 mm rocket launcher
M59 155 mm field cannon (Then designated M1 and M2 long Tom)
M101 105 mm howitzer (Then designated M2A1 towed)
M114 155 mm howitzer (Then designated M1A1 towed)
M115 203 mm howitzer (Then designated M2 towed)
Type 38 75 mm field cannon
Type 98 20 mm AA machine cannon

Ordnance BL 5.5-inch cannon
Ordnance QF 17-pounder anti-tank gun
Ordnance QF 25-pounder field cannon

Communist States

37 mm 61-K M1939 automatic air defense gun
45 mm M1942 (M-42) anti-tank gun
85 mm 52-K M1939 air defense gun
100 mm BS-3 M1944 field cannon
100 mm KS-19 air defense gun
122 mm A-19 M1931/37 cannon
122 mm M-30 M1938 howitzer
152 mm ML-20 M1937 howitzer
Katyusha rocket launcher
Type 38 75 mm field cannon
Type 98 20 mm AA machine cannon
ZiS-2 57 mm M1943 anti-tank gun
ZiS-3 76 mm M1942 divisional cannon

Vehicles

Other vehicles

United Nations command

AEC Armoured Car
Daimler Armoured Car
Daimler Scout Car (Also known as Daimler Dingo armored car)
M3A2 Half-track armored personnel carrier
M7B1 and M7B2 105 mm Priest howitzer motor carriage
M8 Greyhound armored car
M16 Multiple Gun Motor Carriage
M19 Gun Motor Carriage
M20 Armored Utility Car
M29C Weasel supply carrier
M37 105 mm Howitzer Motor Carriage
M39 Armored Utility Vehicle
M40 155 mm Gun motor carriage
M41 155 mm Gorilla howitzer motor carriage
M43 203 mm Howitzer motor carriage
Universal Carrier
Willys MB (Also known as Jeep)

Communist States

BA-64 armored car
BTR-40 armored personnel carrier
GAZ-67 jeep
SU-76 self-propelled gun

Tanks

United Nations command

M4A3E8 Sherman
M24 Chaffee
M26 Pershing
M36 tank destroyer
M42B5 Sherman (Armed with a 105 mm gun and a POA-CWS-H5 flamethrower)
M46 Patton

A22 Churchill infantry tank (C Squadron 7th Royal Tank Regiment, 8th King's Royal Irish Hussars)
A27M Cromwell tank cruiser (Royal Tank Regiment, 8th King's Royal Irish Hussars)
A34 Comet tank cruiser
A41 Centurion Mark III tank cruiser (5th Royal Tank Regiment, 5th Royal Inniskilling Dragoon Guards, 8th King's Royal Irish Hussars)
M4A3 Sherman (Lord Strathcona's Horse (Royal Canadians) (2nd Armoured Regiment))
M4A3E8 Sherman (Lord Strathcona's Horse (Royal Canadians) (2nd Armoured Regiment))
M10 Achilles

Communist States

IS-2 M1944 (PVA)
M4A2E8 76 mm with HVSS Sherman Emcha (From the Soviets through Lend-Lease Act during World War II)
M5A1 Stuart (PVA)
T-34-85

Aircraft

United Nations command

United States

Attack airplanes

Chance-Vought AU-1 Corsair (USMC)
Douglas AD-1 Skyraider (USN, USMC)
Douglas AD-4 Skyraider (USN, USMC)
Grumman AF-2S Guardian (USN)
Grumman-General Motors TBM-3S (USN)

Bomber airplanes

Boeing B-29A Superfortress (USAF) 
Douglas B-26B and C Invader (USAF)

Fighter airplanes

Chance-Vought F4U-4B Corsair (USN, USMC)
Chance-Vought F4U-4C Corsair (USN, USMC)
Chance-Vought F4U-5N Corsair Night Fighter (USMC)
Chance-Vought F4U-5-NL Corsair Night Fighter (USMC)
Douglas F3D-2N Skyknight Night Fighter (USN, USMC)
Grumman F7F-3N Tigercat Night Fighter (USMC)
Grumman F9F-2 Panther (USN, USMC)
Grumman F9F-3 Panther (USN, USMC)
Grumman F9F-5 Panther (USN, USMC)
Lockheed F-80C Shooting Star (USAF)
Lockheed F-94B Starfire (USAF)
McDonnell F2H-2 Banshee (USN, USMC)
North American F-51D Mustang (USAF)
North American F-82F and G Twin Mustang (USAF)
North American F-86A, E and F Sabre (USAF)
Republic F-84E and G Thunderjet (USAF)

Liaison, reconnaissance and observation airplanes

Aeronca L-16A (USAF)
Boeing RB-17G Flying Fortress (USAF)
Boeing RB-29 Superfortress (USAF)
Boeing WB-29 Superfortress (USAF)
Boeing RB-50A, B and E Superfortress (USAF)
Cessna L-19 Bird Dog (USMC, USAF, US Army)
Chance-Vought F4U-4P Corsair (USMC)
Convair RB-36D Peacemaker (USAF)
De Havilland Canada L-20 Beaver (USAF)
Douglas RB-26 Invader (USAF)
Douglas WB-26 Invader (USAF)
Grumman F9F-2P Panther (USN, USMC)
Grumman F9F-5P Panther (USN, USMC)
Lockheed RF-80C Shooting Star (USAF)
McDonnell F2H-2P Banshee (USN, USMC)
North American AT-6 Texan (USAF)
North American AT-6G Texan (USAF)
North American LT-6G Texan (USAF)
North American RB-45C Tornado (USAF)
North American RF-51 Mustang (USAF)
North American RF-86A Sabre (USAF)
North American T-6C, F and G Texan (USAF)
North American-Ryan L-17 Navion (USAF, US Army)
Piper L-4 (USAF)
Stinson L-5G Sentinel (USMC, USAF, US Army)

Patrol, search and rescue airplanes

Boeing SB-17G Flying Fortress (USAF)
Boeing SB-29 Superfortress (USAF)
Consolidated OA-10 Catalina (USAF)
Consolidated P4Y Privateer (USN)
Douglas AD-4W Skyraider (USN, USMC)
Grumman AF-2W Guardian (USN)
Grumman SA-16A Albatross (USAF)
Lockheed P2V-3/3W/4 Neptune (USN)
Martin PBM-5 Mariner (USN)

Tanker airplanes

Boeing KB-29M Superfortress (USAF)

Transport and utility airplanes

Beechcraft C-45F Expediter (USAF)
Curtiss C-46D Commando (USAF)
Douglas C-47A and B Skytrain (USAF)
Douglas C-54G Skymaster (USAF)
Douglas C-124A Globemaster II (USAF)
Douglas R4D-5 Skytrain (USMC)
Douglas R5D-3 Skymaster (USMC)
Fairchild C-82A Packet (USAF)
Fairchild C-119B and C Flying Boxcar (USAF)
Fairchild R4Q-1 Flying Boxcar (USMC)
Grumman-General Motors TBM-3E and R Light Cargo/Ambulance (USMC)
Grumman-General Motors TBM-3U Utility (USN)

Helicopters

Bell H-13D Sioux (USMC, US Army)
Hiller OH-23B/C/D/F/G Raven (US Army)
Sikorsky H-5F and G (USAF)
Sikorsky H-19C Chickasaw (USAF, US Army)
Sikorsky HO3S-1 (USN, USMC)
Sikorsky HRS-1 Chickasaw (USMC)

UK and Commonwealth

Attack airplanes

Fairey Firefly Mk.5 (Royal Navy 800 Naval Air Squadron), (Royal Australian Navy)
Hawker Sea Fury FB.Mk.11 (Royal Navy 800, 810 Naval Air Squadron), (Royal Australian Navy)

Fighter airplanes

Fairey Firefly Mk.5 Night Fighter (Royal Navy 800, 801 Naval Air Squadrons, Royal Australian Navy)
Gloster Meteor F.Mk.8 (Royal Australian Air Force)
North American F-86F Sabre (South African Air Force)
North American Mustang IV (Royal Australian Air Force, South African Air Force)
Supermarine Seafire Mk.47 (Royal Navy 800, 801 Naval Air Squadrons)

Liaison, reconnaissance and observation airplanes

Auster AOP.6 (Royal Air Force)
Cessna L-19 Bird Dog (Royal Australian Air Force)

Patrol, search and rescue airplanes

Short S.25 Sunderland (Royal Air Force)
Supermarine ASR.II Sea Otter  (Royal Navy 825 Naval Air Squadron)

Transport airplanes

Douglas C-47 Dakota (Royal Australian Air Force)
Douglas C-54GM North Star Mark I (Royal Canadian Air Force)

Republic of Korea

Attack airplanes

North American F-51D Mustang (ROKAF)
North American T-6 Texan

Fighter airplanes

North American F-51D Mustang (ROKAF)

Liaison, reconnaissance and observation airplanes

Aeronca L-16 (ROKAF)
Cessna L-19 Bird Dog (ROKAF)
North American T-6 Texan (ROKAF)
North American-Ryan L-17 Navion (ROKAF)
Piper L-4 Grasshopper (ROKAF)
Stinson L-5 Sentinel (ROKAF)

Transport airplanes

Douglas C-47 Skytrain (ROKAF)

Communist States

Attack airplanes

Ilyushin Il-2 Shturmovik (KPAF, PLAAF)
Ilyushin Il-10 Shturmovik - 60 (KPAF, PLAAF)
Ilyushin Il-10U Shturmovik - 33 (KPAF, PLAAF)

Bomber airplanes

Polikarpov Po-2LNB (KPAF)
Tupolev Tu-2S (KPAF, PLAAF)
Yakovlev Yak-18 (KPAF)

Fighter airplanes

Lavochkin La-9 (KPAF, PLAAF)
Lavochkin La-11
Mikoyan-Gurevich MiG-15 (KPAF, PLAAF, Soviet Air Force)
Mikoyan-Gurevich MiG-15bis (KPAF, PLAAF, Soviet Air Force)
Yakovlev Yak-9P - 79 (KPAF, PLAAF)

Transport airplanes

Antonov An-2 (PLAAF, Soviet Air Force)
Douglas C-47 Skytrain (KPAF, PLAAF, Soviet Air Force)
Ilyushin Il-12 (PLAAF, Soviet Air Force)
Lisunov Li-2 (KPAF, PLAAF, Soviet Air Force)

See also
List of U.S. Army weapons by supply catalog designation
List of military equipment used in the Korean War

References

Bibliography
Rottman, Gordon L.  Korean War Order of Battle.  Westport, CT: Praeger Publishing, 2002.

External links
Korean War weapons
Japanese weapons in the Korean war

Weapon
Korean War
Korean War